Louisa Johanna Theodora van Dort (born May 16, 1943 in Surabaya, Dutch East Indies) is a Dutch actress, comedian, singer, writer and artist of Indo (Eurasian) descent. On April 29, 1999, Queen Beatrix appointed her Knight of the Order of Orange-Nassau.

She has appeared on many children's television programs and is best known for her Indo (Dutch-Indonesian) character of Tante Lien in The Late Late Lien Show on Dutch prime time television. Her show was the only television programme ever to showcase Indo (Eurasian) culture and introduced many Indo artists and music to mainstream audiences in the Netherlands.

After three seasons the television series ended in 1988, but her Tante Lien character is popular to this day and in 2007 she was awarded the Silver Medal of Merit for her contributions in this role from the Dutch State Secretary for Defence.

Early life
Wieteke Van Dort was born in Surabaya in what was then the Dutch East Indies under Japanese occupation. While there, she attended two primary schools, and began attending the HBS. When she was thirteen years old, the Van Dort family went on vacation to The Netherlands. While they were abroad, Sukarno nationalized Indonesia and the Van Dort family lost everything. Her family settled in The Hague.

In The Hague, she left middle school without a diploma. Because she was too young for the academy of dramatic arts, she first underwent training to become a nursery school teacher. Although she did not receive a diploma, she did complete three years of HBS. In 1962 and 1963, she attended Toneelgroep Rederijkers (the academy of dramatic arts). While at the academy, she played Laura Wingfield in a performance of The Glass Menagerie. In 1964, she dropped out of the academy and signed a contract with the Nieuwe Komedie. In 1968, she began working with Wim Kan and Corry Vonk as a comedian.

Early career

After her marriage to Theo Moody, she concentrated with much success on radio and television. In De Stratemakeropzeeshow with Aart Staartjes and Joost Prinsen, she played the 'distinguished lady'. In the 1970s, she appeared on the children's program Lawaaipapegaai. The writer's collective consisted of Hans Dorrestijn, Karel Eykman, Ries Moonen, Fetze Pijlman, Jan Riem, during which time Willem Wilmink (a scriptwriter) died. Wieteke van Dort also participated in the television program Het Klokhuis by overseeing the text in the scriptwriting collective.

Tante Lien
Her most successful character is Tante Lien, which she introduced through her popular television programme The Late Late Lien Show. She had to push hard to get the concept produced as the TV production companies and broadcasters initially did not believe there was a market for this. Eventually three seasons were aired in 1979, 1980, 1981 and finally in 1988. The show became the only platform ever for Indo culture on national television.

Each episode shows funny, old Tante Lien hosting a cosy gathering (Koempoelan) at her home in which she and her guests snack on Indo food and reminisce about life back in the good old days (tempo doeloe) of the Dutch East Indies. Her guests are usually famous Indo and Totok (full blooded Dutch settlers of the colonial Dutch East Indies) artists that perform solo or together with Tante Lien or each other. Artists that have appeared in the show include the Blue Diamonds, Sandra Reemer and Willem Nijholt.

Within the Indo community itself the show was viewed by some to be rather controversial, mainly due to the fact the Tante Lien character speaks Dutch with a strong Indo accent. Certain factions in the Indo community claimed this as the reason they could not identify with the show and considered it not representative of well educated and assimilated Indos. In one episode the show makes fun of this criticism by having a posh speaking Indo woman party crash Tante Liens gathering.

Late career
In the parliamentary elections of 1994 she was fourth on the list of the Natural Law Party.

On June 29, 2007, during the official Dutch Veterans Day in the Hague, Wieteke van Dort received the Silver Medal of Merit from the Minister of Defence for her role of Tante Lien in which she has performed on veterans' gatherings for over thirty years. "Through her efforts she highlights our solidarity and strengthens the bond between Dutch society and the ex-soldiers making a substantial contribution to the welfare of veterans. In her performances she also bridges the gap between the older and younger veterans.".

In 2008 she starred in the feature film Santa Claus and the Secret of the Great Book by director Martin Nellestijn. In 2009 she played the role of Queen in the film Santa Claus and the Lost Packet Boat from the same director.

Van Dort often cooperates with benefits and non-profit events for good causes. In 2010 she voluntary contributed to music made to relief women suffering from the loss of a baby, just before, during or soon after birth.

Wieteke van Dort is still active in the fine arts and regularly performs her popular character Tante Lien. Her voice can be heard narrating the stories in the Dutch fairytale theme park Efteling.

Theatre roles
1960 "An Angel Of Inaction" by Claude Puget, the role of angel.
1961 "Les Jours Heureux" by Claude Puget, the role of Pernette.
1962 "The Glass Menagerie" by Tennessee Williams, the role of Laura Wingfield.
1964 "De Knecht van twee meesters van Goldoni" by Henk Votel, the role of a small servant.
1964 "Our Town" by Thornton Wilder, all of the children's roles.
1964 "The Paris Wedding" by E.Labiche / Marc-Michel, silent role of Suzanne, in a review.
1965–1966 "De Schilderijenoorlog" by Jan Staal, first leading role, the 11-year-old girl Jannie Koperslager.
1966 "Romeo and Juliet" by William Shakespeare, the role of Juliet with Lex Schoorel as Romeo, translated by Adrian Brine.
1967 "De grote en de kleine koning" by B. Kindervoorstelling, the role of B. Minoli.
1967 "Een huwelijk onder Lodewijk de XV" by A.Dumas Père, the silent role of Moortje.
1967 "Ploeft , kindervoorstelling" by M.C. Machado, the role of Maribel.
1967 "En het geschiedde in die dagen… Cabareteske Kerstcantate" by J.van Hoogland with music by Han Reiziger
1968 "ABC Cabaret by Wim Kan and Corry Vonk.
1971 "Porselein”
1975 "Zwaarmoedige verhalen voor bij de centrale verwarming”
1979 "Martijn en de magiër”

Television roles 
1968 "De Avonturen van Pinokkio" Pinokkio
1968 "Oebele" Aagje Ritsema
1971 "Pip + Zip" (voice) Pip
1972 "'n Zomerzotheid" Dot
1972 "De Stratenmaker op zee show"  De deftige dame
1975 "Kunt u mij de weg naar Hamelen vertellen, meneer?" (8 episodes)
1975 "De steen der dommen"
1975 "Onder een hoedje"
1975 "De gaten van war"
1975 "De koude kermis"
1975 "Een luchtkasteel"
1978 "Pinkeltje" Pinkelotje
1978 "Mikke Makke Marsepein"
1979 "J.J. de Bom voorheen: 'De kindervriend'" Titia Konijn
2001 "Costa!" Ruth (1 episode)
2001 "Zwoele nachten met een pop-idool" Ruth
2006 "Sinterklaas en het uur van de waarheid" Hare Majesteit
2007 "'t Schaep Met De 5 Pooten" Manja Wegenwijs (1 episode)
2007 "Een kastelein is ook maar een mens" Manja Wegenwijs
2007 "Het Klokhuis" Fan (2 episodes)
2007 "Breaking News: Magneten" Winkelende mevrouw
2007 "Grime" Fan

Music and discography 
Musical performances on television
1975 "Kunt u mij de weg naar Hamelen vertellen, meneer?" (2 episodes)
1975 "De steen der dommen" (performer: "Het geluk is met de dommen" (Het geluk is gek))
1975 "De gaten van war" (performer: "Een windmolen draait als de wind waait")
1978 "Pinkeltje" (performer: "Pokkenlied", "Heen en weer ballon", "Logeren bij Meneer Dick Laan", "Jeuklied")
2007 "'t Schaep Met De 5 Pooten" (1 episode)
2007 "Een kastelein is ook maar een mens" (performer: "Wat water in de wijn")

Vinyl long play albums
1968 – 1970 Oebele (4 records):
LP Welkom In Oebele, Polydor 236 811
LP Nieuwe Liedjes Van Oebele, Polydor 236 827
LP Oebele Is Hupsakee, Polydor 2419 004
LP OE Van Oebele, Polydor F- 784/3 (Book and Album)
1969 Kinderzangfestival
1973 De Stratemakeropzeeshow, Parts 1 and 2 – Part 1: Decca 6499 457, Part 2: Philips 9293 001
1974 Pip En Zip, CNR 541637
1975 Barbapapa (Vertellingen), Philips 9299 639
1975 Een Fraai Stuk Burengerucht, Philips 6410 088 – First solo LP
1977 Ot En Sien In Indië, Philips 6410 130
1978 Weerzien Met Indië, Philips 6410 956
1978 Kun Je Nog Zingen, Zing Dan Mee, Philips 6423 114
1978 Radio Lawaaipapegaai, Parts 1 and 2 – Part 1: Philips 9293 011, Part 2: Philips 9293025
1978 Pinkeltje, Philips 9293 017
1979 Hallo Bandoeng, Philips 6423 135 / Music For The Millions, 826 751-1
1979 J.J.De Bom, Voorheen De Kindervriend, Parts 1 and 2 – Part 1: Polydor 2441 087, Part 2: Ariola Benelux b.v. 203 620
1980 Kortjakje Is Weer Beter, Philips 6423 392 / Music for the Millions 824 399-1
1981 We Gaan De Boom Versieren, Philips 6423 391
1981 De Koempoelan Van Tante Lien, Philips 6423 450
1982 Huilen Is Gezond, Philips 6423 512
1984 Martientje In Het Tandenrijk (I.O. Van Zendium), Bridge SP Amsterdam 08-022625-20
1984 De Betoverde Speelgoedwinkel, (Jeugdconcerten) RCA Records GL 44075
1985 Wie Komt Er In M'n Kamertje?, Quintessence Records BM 602001
1987 Vera De Muis, Quintessence Records QS 900 001-1
1988 De Late Late Lien Evergreen Show, Quintessence Records QS 600 807

Singles
1975 “Diamanten bruidspaar”
1975 “Arm Den Haag” (Philips 6012 699)
1978 “Ajoen Ajoen” (Philips 6012 832)
1978 “Krontjong Kemajoran” (Philips 6017 030)
1979 “Hallo Bandoeng" (6012 945)
1979 "Geef Mij Maar Nasi Goreng" (6012 869)
1979 "Mijn Kleine Nasibal" (Philips 6012 877)
1985 "Dwaze moeders van het plein" (Philips 6017 304)
1986 Spanish version of "Las madres locas de la plaza" (Phonogram 6845.151)
2022 “Surabayaku” with Michiel Eduar (digital release)

CDs
1980 We Gaan De Boom Versieren, Philips 814 636-2
1980 Kortjakje Is Weer Beter, Philips 824 399-2
1987 Vera De Muis Quintessence, QS 900 001-4
1988 De Late Late Lien Evergreen Show, Quintessence QS 800.815
1991 Weerzien Met Indië, Philips 848 399-2
1992 De Koempoelan Van Tante Lien, Mercury 514 160-2
1992 Het Klokhuis, Quintessence QS 900.250-2
1993 Liedjes Van Verlangen, Philips 518 055-2
1995 Batavia (N.A.V. De Doop Van Het V.O.C.- Schip), Bingo Music NL BAT 7495
1995 Kerst in De Gordel Van Smaragd, Vincent Produkties 55 1053-2 (with Lonny, Justine, Wieteke, Rudy van Dalm, Andres, en Chris Latul)
1996 We’ll Meet Again, Mercury 534 124-2
1997 Dubbel – CD Wieteke Van Dort 25 Jaar Als Tante Lien, Mercury 534952-2
1998 Sprookjes Van Tante Lien (Part 1), R. Prod.Records R.P. 07
1998 Verhalen En Liedjes Over Het Volk Van Laaf, PolyMedia 559 369-2
1999 Ot En Sien in Indië, Universal Music 546 019-2
1999 Kun Je Nog Zingen, Zing Dan Mee, Mercury 826 752-2
1999 Winnie De Poeh 2 Cd's Vertellingen Bij 2 Boeken, Publisher Libre Leeuwarden
2001 Dubbel – Cd Het Mooiste Van Wieteke Van Dort, Universal Music 586013-2
2002 Sprookjes Van Tante Lien (Part 2), R. Prod.Records R.P.13
2004 Silver Moments, A Munich Records Production 42451 54402
2006 Stratemakeropzeeshow, (Audio book) Universal Music 
2007 Kind in Surabaja, (Audio book) Publisher De Fontein, Baarn 
2007 Piggelmee, (Audio book) Publisher Rubinstein 

DVDs
2005 Pasar Malam Besar Live, registration 2001 Wieteke van Dort Productions 8 711255 238828
2005 Pasar Malam Besar Live, registration 2002 Wieteke van Dort Productions 8 711255 238828
2006 The Late Late Lien Show´S 3 DVD´S Met 8 VARA TV Show´S Uit 1979, ´80 En ´81, Universal Music 0602498 783740 0 602498 783757 0 602498 783764

References

External links
Official website

.
Lijst van programma's (oude catalogus) in the archive of 'Beeld & Geluid' 
Lijst van programma's (nieuwe catalogus) in the archive of 'Beeld & Geluid'

Other sources
  Kortendick, Oliver. "Indische Nederlanders und Tante Lien: eine Strategie zur Konstruktion ethnischer Identität.“ (Master Thesis, Canterbury University of Kent, Social Anthropology, 1990).  
Biografie Wieteke van Dort 
Welkom op de website van Wieteke van Dort 

1943 births
Living people
Dutch women comedians
Dutch women singers
Dutch writers
People from Surabaya
Indo people
Dutch actresses